While We Were Waiting is the first studio album by Canadian country music singer-songwriter Jason Blaine. The album was released on independent record label Jay Bird Music on July 26, 2005. Icon Records re-released the album on June 24, 2006.

Track listing

 "While We Were Waiting" (Paul Brandt, Jason Blaine) – 3:16
 "What I Can't Forget" (Deric Ruttan, Margaret Findley, Jim McBride) – 3:20
 "Change the Channel" (Blaine) – 3:18
 "Heartache Like Mine" (Blaine) – 4:38
 "Last Slow Dance" (Blaine) – 3:20
 "What Makes a Man" (Sean Patrick McGraw, Blaine, Rory Lee Feek) – 3:09
 "Reinvent the Wheel" (Blaine) – 3:52
 "Say It Again" (Blaine) – 3:47
 "That Shine" (Blaine) – 3:11
 "That's What I Do" (Blaine) – 3:41

2005 debut albums
Jason Blaine albums